Joannes Susenbrotus (also spelled Susembrotus, also known as Johannes or Hans Susenbrot, 1484/1485–1542/1543) was a German humanist, teacher of Latin, and author of textbooks.

Susenbrotus was born in the Imperial Free City of Wangen im Allgäu and studied at the universities of Vienna and Basel. From 1506, he was a teacher in Leutkirch, and subsequently in Pfullendorf, Schaffhausen, and – from 1522 – in Ravensburg.

He wrote several books in Latin, amongst them a Latin textbook Grammaticae artis institutio and a collection of Christian poems. His rhetorics textbook Epitome troporum defines 132 tropes and figures and gives examples of their use in ancient literature as well as references in contemporary books on rhetorics.

Living in the days of the Protestant Reformation, Susenbrotus distinctly remained a Roman Catholic. Around 1542, Susenbrotus died from injuries sustained when a drunk caskmaker beat him up in Ravensburg.

Susenbrotus' textbooks spread his name to pupils all over Europe. William Shakespeare seems to have known Epitome troporum, since – as T. W. Baldwin pointed out – he uses numerous examples from Susenbrotus' book in his works. He is also a well-known rhetorician to other Elizabethan writers and poets such as Gabriel Harvey, Thomas Nashe and Thomas Watson. On 12 March 1615, students of Trinity College, Cambridge, played the Latin comedy, Susenbrotus, or Fortunia, probably written by John Chappell, in the presence of King James I at Royston. As late as 1660 the English educationalist Charles Hoole recommends Susenbrotus' Epitome as a textbook for grammar schools.

Works 

Grammaticae artis institutio, Schumann, Leipzig 1539, and various later editions
Scholae christianae epigrammatum libri duo, ex variis Christianorum poetis excerpti, ac iam à multis mendis repurgati in usum Christianorum adulescentulorum, Brylinger, Basel 1541 (collected Christian poems)
Epitome Troporvm Ac Schematvm Et Grammaticorum & Rhetorum: ad Authores tum prophanos tum sacros intelligendos non-minus utilis quàm necessaria, Froschauer, Tiguri (Zurich) 1541? and various later editions, first edition in England 1562
Methodus octo partium orationis una cum formulis declinandi nomina ac coniugandi verba, pueris nuper musarum adyta ingressis cognitu cum primis necessaria, Froschauer, Tiguri (Zurich) 1565

References

Thomas Whitfield Baldwin: William Shakspere's Small Latine and Lesse Greeke. University of Illinois Press, Urbana IL 1944
Joseph Xavier Brennan, The Epitome troporum ac schematum of Joannes Susenbrotus (Latin facsimile, English translation, and commentary), diss. University of Illinois, 1953, 
Joseph Xavier Brennan: Joannes Susenbrotus. A forgotten Humanist, in: PMLA Publications of the modern language association of America, December 1960, Vol. LXXV, No. 5
Joseph Xavier Brennan: The Grammaticae Artis Institutio of Joannes Susenbrotus, the Epitome Troporum ac Schematum etc., in: Papers of the Bibliographical Society of the University of Virginia, 14/1961
Wilhelm Fox: Hans Susenbrot, ein verschollener schwäbischer Humanist und lateinischer Schulmeister, in: Diözesan-Archiv von Schwaben, Vol. 25, 1907, pp. 8–12
Connie McQuillen (ed.): A comedy called Susenbrotus. University of Michigan Press, Ann Arbor 1997, 
Ulrich-Dieter Oppitz: Ein Sachsenspiegel-Fragment in Ravensburg und Johann Susenbrot, in: Ulm und Oberschwaben, Vol. 51, 2000, pp. 216–219
Thomas Zinsmaier: Johannes Susenbrotus''' Epitome troporum ac schematum – eine frühneuzeitliche literarische Rhetorik, in: Wolfgang Kofler / Karlheinz Töchterle (edd.): Die antike Rhetorik in der europäischen Geistesgeschichte. Studien-Verlag, Innsbruck / Vienna / Bolzano 2005, pp. 250–269.

External links
Susenbrotus: Epitome'', Lyons 1551 edition online, London 1576 edition online, table of contents

Year of birth uncertain
1540s deaths
People from Wangen im Allgäu
German Renaissance humanists
German male writers